Hate It or Love It is the fourth studio album by American rapper Chingy. It was released on December 18, 2007, by Disturbing tha Peace, Slot-A-Lot Records, and Def Jam South Recordings. This was the first Chingy's album that was not to be released in the United Kingdom.

Chart performance
The album entered at number 84 on the Billboard 200, with first-week sales of 30,000 copies in the United States, making it Chingy's lowest-charting album in his career.

Singles
The first official radio single was "Fly Like Me" featuring Amerie.
The second single was "Gimme Dat". The video was premiered on February 8, 2008, on TRL, 106 and Park and Yahoo Videos.

Track listing

Chart performance

References

2007 albums
Chingy albums
Def Jam Recordings albums
Disturbing tha Peace albums
Albums produced by Cool & Dre
Albums produced by Maejor